The purge known as Yangjae Station Graffiti Incident 양재역 벽서 사건 (良才驛壁書事件) was one of the many political purges that occurred in Korea during the Joseon period. It is also known as the Jeong-mi Sahwa since it took place in 1547 (King Myeongjong' 2nd year).

The initial event was a graffiti posted at Yangjae Station (nowadays Yangjae-dong, Seocho-gu, Seoul). Yun Won-hyeong posted the false notice: 女主執政於上 奸臣李芑等 弄權於下 國之將亡 可立而待 豈不寒心哉 to defame himself and his relatives. And then he used it as a pretext to remove his political opponents, starting from Prince Bong-seong (봉성군, 鳳城君李岏, 1528-1547). This purge was enlarged to all the survivors of the Dae Yun clan.

Sources

, 568 pages

References

Joseon dynasty
1547 in Asia
16th century in Korea